The ICL 20-20 Indian Championship 2008/09 was the second tournament of the second ICL season, it was also the second 20-20 Indian Championship. The tournament commenced on 10 October 2008, with the final match to be held on 16 November 2008. Both the opening and closing fixtures were played in Hyderabad, India. The league consisted of nine teams. Each team playing each other once.

2008/09 season
The 2008/09 season saw the introduction of a new team, the Dhaka Warriors.

The season opener consisted of this calendar year's Edelweiss 20s Challenge finalists the Lahore Badshahs and the Hyderabad Heroes.

Each winning teams gets 2,500,000 Rupees; while each Man of the match receives 200,000 Rupees, a trophy and an electric motobike.

Venues
All the games were played at one of the following stadiums:

Lal Bahadur Shastri Stadium, Hyderabad, Telangana 
Sardar Vallabhbhai Patel Stadium, Ahmedabad, Gujarat 
Tau Devi Lal Stadium, Gurgaon, Haryana 
Tau Devi Lal Cricket Stadium, Panchkula, Haryana

Fixtures and results

Standings

Knock-out

Awards
 Longest six: Imran Nazir (Badshahs) (114m)
 Most improved player: Stuart Binny (Heroes)
 Man of the Series: Rana Naved-ul-Hasan (Badshahs)

References

External links 
 Results & Scorecards at ESPNcricinfo

Indian Cricket League seasons